Juan Rovira Tarazona (5 May 1930 – 3 June 1990) was a Spanish politician from the Union of the Democratic Centre (UCD) who served as Minister of Health and Social Security from April 1979 to September 1980.

References

1930 births
1990 deaths
Complutense University of Madrid alumni
Government ministers of Spain
20th-century Spanish politicians
Health ministers of Spain